Jaime Ramírez may refer to:
 Jaime Ramírez (footballer, 1931-2003), Chilean football winger
 Jaime Ramírez (police officer) (1940-1986), official of the National Police of Colombia
 Jaime Ramírez (footballer, born 1967), Chilean football midfielder
 Jaime Ramírez (cyclist) (born 1989), Colombian cyclist